Oskar Lõvi may refer to:
  (1892–1977), Estonian agronomist, politician
 Oskar Lõvi (journalist) (1903–1942), Estonian sportjournalist, politician